The 1976 Bracknell District Council election took place on 6 May 1976, to elect all 31 members in 16 wards for Bracknell District Council in England.  The election was held on the same day as other local elections as part of the 1976 United Kingdom local elections.  The Conservative Party ousted the one-term Labour Party council, winning all but 4 of the seats, with Labour group leader Bill Lindop losing his seat of Wildridings.  The Liberal Party were able to hold onto their solitary seat in Crowthorne & Easthampstead.  Despite leading the Conservative group into the election, Dorothy Benwell would be replaced by newly-elected Tim Wood, who subsequently became leader of the council.

Ward results
An asterisk (*) denotes an incumbent councillor standing for re-election

Ascot

Binfield

Bracknell (Great Hollands)

Bracknell (Old Bracknell)

Bullbrook

College Town

Cranbourne

Crowthorne & Easthampstead

Garth

Harmanswater

Little Sandhurst

Priestwood

Sandhurst

St. Marys

Warfield

Wildridings

Footnotes

References

Bracknell
Bracknell Forest Borough Council elections